Lingaya's Lalita Devi Institute of Management & Sciences (LLDIMS) is a private college affiliated with Guru Gobind Singh Indraprastha University and located in Mandi, Delhi. Admission to LLDIMS is through the Common Entrance Test (CET) conducted by Guru Gobind Singh Indraprastha University. LLDIMS is recognised under section 2(f) by UGC.

Background
LLDIMS was established in 2005 by Gadde Charitable Trust.

Recognition and accreditation
Lingaya's Lalita Devi Institute of Management & Sciences has been accredited by the National Assessment and Accreditation Council (NAAC) with an "A" grade. The institute offers B.Com. (Hons.),BA Eco(Hons.), B.Ed., BBA, BCA and BJMC undergraduate full-time degree programmes.

References

Universities and colleges in Delhi
Colleges of the Guru Gobind Singh Indraprastha University
Journalism schools in India
Business schools in Delhi